The Argut (Arkıt) is a river in central Altai Republic, a right tributary of Katun. Upstream from its confluence with the Dzhazator, it is called Akalakha.

Geography

Due to the abundance of glaciers 40% of the runoff is yielded glaciers and permanent snow (in particular, from the northern slope of the Tavan Bogd massif), 34% - seasonal snow 17% - rain, 9% - by groundwater. The river is frozen from November until April.

References

Rivers of the Altai Republic